KNYD (90.5 FM) is a radio station broadcasting a Christian radio format. Licensed to Broken Arrow, Oklahoma, United States, the station serves multiple markets through a series of broadcast translators and repeater stations. The station is currently owned by David Ingles Ministries Church Inc.

Translators
In addition to the main station, KNYD utilizes 6 translators and 6 additional stations.

References

External links
oasisnetwork.org

NYD